Ancistrus lineolatus, also known as the Bristlenose Catfish is a species of catfish in the family Loricariidae. It is native to South America, where it occurs in the Orteguaza River basin, which is part of the Japurá River drainage in Colombia.

Ecology
The Ancistrus lineolatus is an air breathing freshwater armored catfish native to central and south america The species reaches 9 cm (3.5 inches) in length.  Mature males and sometimes females have small, fleshy growths that can be observed as tentacles grow on the Snout of these fish. This has only been observed in the genus Ancistrus.

References 

Ancistrus
Fish described in 1943